Stinking Lick Creek is a stream in the U.S. state of West Virginia.

Stinking Lick Creek was so named from an incident when the rotting corpse of an animal gave off a foul odor.

See also
List of rivers of West Virginia

References

Rivers of Monroe County, West Virginia
Rivers of Summers County, West Virginia
Rivers of West Virginia